The Pendulum is a 12-issue miniseries of comic books based upon the Dark Carnival universe, a mythology detailed in the music of the Insane Clown Posse. Distributed by Chaos! Comics, the series was published from January 2000 until December 2001. A graphic novel containing all 12 issues was released on August 20, 2002 along with an album featuring most of the Pendulum singles. It is the group's 5th compilation album, and their 17th overall release. Prologue and Spin-Off Comics, #1 The Upz & Downz of the Wicked Clownz (1999). #2 The Amazing Jeckel Brothers (1999). #3 Raze the Desertz of Glass (1999). Hallowicked (2001). Halls of Illusion (2002).

Creation
In 1999, Chaos! Comics signed on to publish a 12-part comic book series about Insane Clown Posse. After choosing Jumpsteady as the writer for the series, the group decided to release new singles with each issue. However, due to other responsibilities, the duo was unable to record new material for several issues. Each 32-page issue of the comic was polybagged with a CD single in a cardboard sleeve; the reverse of all 12 sleeves could be combined to form a poster.

The first issue was released with a variant cover featuring art from The Amazing Jeckel Brothers, advertised as 1 in every 4 issues. On August 20, 2002, a graphic novel of all 12 issues entitled "The Pendulum Tome" was released. A prologue, special Halloween comic issue, and full-length album was released with the novel. The album featured all of the singles released with the comic book issues, with the exception of the three singles from The Pendulum #7 which was replaced with a spoken word intro.

Plot summary
The miniseries details Insane Clown Posse's attempts to stop a demon named Killnor from destroying a priest named Father Jesus, who possesses miraculous healing powers. Killnor summons the undead duo Twiztid, a crazed police SWAT team, and a host of demonic minions to stop the clowns. Insane Clown Posse call upon the assistance of the Joker's Cards to overcome the minions. An all-out showdown takes place at the demon's earthly headquarters with the fate of humanity hanging in the balance of the Pendulum.

Music and lyrics
Several songs were also featured on several other albums. The songs "The Amazing Maze" and "$50 Bucks" appeared on the 2000 compilation album Psychopathics from Outer Space. Run, Superstar, Confessions, and Nuttin' But A Bitch Thang were later featured on Forgotten Freshness Volume 3. The song "Toxic Love" was also the 2000 Hallowicked single. An alternate, cleaner version of "The Great Show" was used as the entrance music for the professional wrestling stable Oddities in the World Wrestling Federation. The song was featured on the album WWF The Music, Vol. 3.

The song "I Don't Care" was originally slated for Dark Lotus' debut album Tales from the Lotus Pod, but instead appeared on Twiztid's Cryptic Collection Vol. 2. The song was later used in Juggalo Championship Wrestling's highlights video on JCW, Volume 2. The song "Ain't Nuttin' But a Bitch Thang," originally released on Insane Clown Posse's website, is a dis track directed toward rapper Eminem. The songs "What Rydas Do Fo Money," "Who Wanna Flex?," "I Don't Wanna Die" were originally intended for solo albums by each member of the group Psychopathic Rydas, but the idea was scrapped. Those 3 songs were the only songs on The Pendulum #7 "The Rydas EP" cd.

Track listing

References

External links

Chaos! Comics titles
Comics based on musical groups
Cultural depictions of hip hop musicians
2002 compilation albums
Insane Clown Posse compilation albums